Paththini (පත්තිනි) is a 2016 Sinhala epic-drama film written and directed by Sunil Ariyarathna and produced by Dr. Milina Sumathipala, co-produced by Jagath Sumathipala and Thilanga Sumathipala on behalf of Sumathi Films. The film features Pooja Umashankar in the title role, Uddika Premarathna in the lead role while Ravindra Randeniya, Lucky Dias, Veena Jayakody, and Aruni Rajapaksha appear in supporting roles. The film is based on the Tamil epic Silappatikaram, written by Ilango Adigal.  The film was released on 5 May 2016 in the film halls of the EAP Circuit.

Plot
The film is based on the Tamil epic Silappatikaram written by Ilango Adigal.

More than 2000 years ago, Southern India was divided into three Tamil kingdoms, namely the Chola, Pandya, and Chera dynasties which ruled most of present-day Tamil Nadu and Kerala. Kannagi was born in the city of Puhar in the Chola dynasty. She is married to a rich baron named Kovalan. They lived a beautiful, long married life. Meanwhile, the ceremony of appointing Madhavi  as the princess in the Chola kingdom was held at this time. Kovalan was also invited to the ceremony among the dignitaries. 

After the appointment of Madhavi as the princess of the actresses by the king, he gave her permission to choose anyone as her husband among the dignitaries. Impressing all the participants, Madhavi chose Kovalan as her husband. Kovalan also began to like Madhavi because of her beautiful appearance and her talent. Due to this incident, the beautiful married life between Kannagi and Kovalan had been broken. Kovalan spends all his wealth on Madhavi. Kannagi finds out about Kovalan and Madhavi's relationship and breaks down. After her heartbreak, Kannagi is abused by youngsters. Kovalan's father advises Kannagi to marry someone else, but, due to her chastity, she instead waits for Kovalan to return. 

Because of their profession, Madhavi had to entertain the dignitaries who came for her. Her actions are not accepted by Kovalan. Because of these reasons, disputes had been created among them and Kovalan ends his relationship with Madhavi and reunites with Kannagi. Kannagi forgives him and they live together happily.

But now they are poor because Kovalan had spent all his wealth on Madhavi. After all, they only have Kannagi's golden ruby-encrusted anklets which are valuable and they are subjected to the sight of the people in the city of Puhar. They run away from the Chola kingdom to the Pandya kingdom with the intention of living freely thereby selling Kannagi's golden anklets.

They escaped secretly without knowing others except for Madhavi. She waits for them on the way of them with her hostess. They find out that Madhavi is pregnant with Kovalan's child. Because of this incident, Kannagi requests Kovalan to go back for her but Kovalan refuses the request. At last, Kovalan and Kannagi move to the Pandya kingdom while Madhavi leaves for her home.

With time, Madhavi gives birth to her daughter Manimekala. Hearing the story of her father and mother at a young age, Manimekala becomes dissatisfied with her normal life. Due to this reason, she refuses the marriage proposal of the Chola prince. She converts to Buddhism after hearing the sermon of a Buddhist monk in the Chola kingdom. But the prince is always after her. One day, he was killed by Manimekala and she was banished from the kingdom for her act.

Kovalan finds out about Madhavi and her daughter Manimekala, but he repents for his actions and decides not to meet Madhavi and Manimekala again. Kovalan and Kannagi lived for so long without selling the anklets but now they got to know that they couldn't resist their life without selling them. Kovalan is determined to sell one anklet and keep one anklet with Kannagi and he leaves for Madurapura (present-day Madurai), the capital of the Pandya dynasty.

Meanwhile, he approaches Madurapura, At the same time, one of the anklets of the Pandya queen has been stolen. The king announces a prize for the person who brings the queen's anklet back. Kovalan had to meet the royal goldsmith (the one who stole the queen's anklet) to sell Kannagi's anklet. The mischievous goldsmith rushes to the palace and tells the king that he caught the thief who stole the royal anklet.

The king orders his men to capture Kovalan and return the royal anklet. After Kovalan is brought to the palace, the king orders his men to execute him without thinking twice. Meanwhile, Kannagi comes to Madhurapura and searches for Kovalan She comes to know that Kovalan was executed for falsely stealing the royal anklet. The king and queen are happy that they got their anklet. But Kannagi storms into the palace court and throws the anklet with such force that it breaks open. The anklet is revealed to contain rubies, as opposed to the queen's anklet which contains pearls. The queen faints out of shock. Kannagi curses the king for his actions and curses Madurapura to be burnt to the ground. A spark of fire appears and kills the king, the queen, and everyone in Madurapura. Madurapura is burnt to the ground as Kannagi ascends to heaven. After this, the people of Sri Lanka and Tamil Nadu revere Kannagi as a goddess and call her Pattini or Kannagi Amman.

Cast
 Pooja Umashankar as Kannagi, also known as Pattini or Kannagi Amman
 Uddika Premarathna as Kovalan
 Aruni Rajapaksha as Madhavi
 Vinu Udani Siriwardhana as Manimekala
 Nita Fernando as Chithrapathi
 Avanthi Aponsu as Devanthi
 Ravindra Randeniya as Pandya King
 Sanath Gunathilake as Soli King
 Ramani Siriwardhana as Queen Consort of Pandya King
 Daya Alwis as Royal goldsmith
 Lucky Dias as King Gajaba
 Wijeratne Warakagoda as Kovalan's father
 Chithra Warakagoda as Kavundi
 Ama Wijesekara as Vasanthimala
 Vasantha Vittachchi as Paththini Hami
 Anura Bandara Rajaguru as Drummer
 Sampath Tennakoon as Athura's father  
 Madusha Ramasinghe as Paththini Devi
 Thushari Wehalla as Deepathilaka
 Surangi Koshala as Shalini
 Priya Vithanachchi as Goddess Madurapathi
 Yasas Rathnayake as Prince Udaya
 Miyuri Samarasinghe as Villager

Soundtrack

The soundtrack of the film is composed by Rohana Weerasinghe, with lyrics written by Sunil Ariyarathna and Praneeth Abeysundara.

Release
The film was released on 5 May 2016 in more than 30 EAP circuit cinemas. The film trailer was released one month prior to the release date.

References

External links
මහාචාර්ය සුනිල් ආරියරත්නගේ මමෝරම්‍ය රූප කාව්‍යය
‘පත්තිනි’ චිත්‍රපටයේ රඟපාන්න ‘පූජා’ මුලින් බෑ කිව්වා

2016 films
2010s Sinhala-language films
2010s historical drama films
Sri Lankan historical drama films
2016 drama films